Steven Brandon Ward (born November 12, 1980) is an American television presenter, matchmaker, and entrepreneur. He is the host and executive producer of the show "Tough Love," an American reality television series that aired on VH1.

Personal life

Ward was born in Philadelphia, Pennsylvania, on November 12, 1980. For most of his youth, Ward lived throughout Southeastern Pennsylvania. In the Fall of 1993 his family relocated to Northern Virginia and he attended Fairfax High School (Fairfax, Virginia), where he played junior varsity football and wrestling, and varsity lacrosse, before graduating in 1998. 

Ward attended Drexel University as an international business major and French minor. He graduated in 2003.

On November 16, 2013, Ward proposed to his longtime girlfriend, Madison Pard.

Career

After graduation, Ward worked as a mortgage broker during the refinance boom of the 2000s.

Ward began his training as a matchmaker at a very young age. Shortly after graduating college he joined his mother JoAnn Ward in her private Philadelphia area based matchmaking business, It's About Time! Master Matchmaker. He soon rebranded the company, Master Matchmakers and expanded the business throughout the Mid Atlantic.

In 2007, High Noon Entertainment approached Ward to develop a dating show. In 2008, Drew Barrymore's Flower Films and High Noon Entertainment hired Ward to host VH1 Tough Love. Ward hosted several seasons of the show.

In 2009, Ward co-authored a book with his mom titled Crash Course in Love. The book was published by Pocket Books, a division of Simon and Schuster.

In April 2012, Ward was nominated by George Tsetsekos, dean of the LeBow College of Business for Drexel University to be one Philadelphia Business Journal's 40 Under 40, in its 22nd year, which recognizes local young professionals for outstanding success and contributions to their community. The winners were selected from more than 250 nominations. 

Ward has served as a spokesperson for brands such as Pantene (Procter & Gamble) and Crowne Plaza Hotels (Intercontinental Hotel Group) and has also spoken to college audiences at Ohio State University, Slippery Rocky University, Chapman University, University of California Long Beach, University of California Irvine and Drexel University as well as to business leaders and audiences in casinos and venues of the like. On March 23, 2019 he spoke in a lightning talk at the 2019 Know Conference on "Building Better Trust Scores".

References

1980 births
Living people
Drexel University alumni
Participants in American reality television series
Television personalities from Philadelphia